Lot 11 is a township in Prince County, Prince Edward Island, Canada.  It is part of Halifax Parish. Following the Seven Years' War, Lot 11 was awarded in the land lottery of 1767 to Colonel Hunt Walsh, the commanding officer of 28th Regiment of Foot at the capture of Louisbourg and the Battle of the Plains of Abraham. While ownership remained with the heirs of Colonel Walsh, portions of the lot were leased to settlers under sequential administration by land agents James Bardin Palmer, John Large and James Warburton. In 1856, the Walsh heirs sold the lot to the colonial government for resale to leaseholders in accordance with the Land Purchase Act of 1853.

Communities

Incorporated municipalities:

 Lady Slipper
 Lot 11 and Area (does not contain the entire township)

Civic address communities:

 Conway
 Foxley River
 Freeland
 Inverness
 McNeills Mills
 Murray Road
 Poplar Grove
 Portage

Notes

Sources
 

11
Geography of Prince County, Prince Edward Island